Hippolyte Lecomte (28 December 1781, Puiseaux – 25 July 1857, Paris) was a French painter best known for large scale historical paintings and ballet designs. His wife, born Camille Vernet, was the sister of the painter Émile Jean-Horace Vernet; the caricaturist Jean Ignace Isidore Gérard, better known as "J.J. Grandville", worked in Lecomte's studio. His son, Émile Vernet-Lecomte, was also a noted painter.

Principal works 
 Napoléon Ier se faisant présenter à Astorga des prisonniers anglais et ordonne de les traiter avec des soins particuliers, janvier 1809, 1810, Palace of Versailles
 Reddition de Mantoue, le 2 février 1797 : le général Wurmser se rend au général Sérurier, Salon de 1812, Palace of Versailles
 Episode de la guerre d'Espagne en 1823, prise des retranchements de Sainte-Marguerite devant la Corogne, le 5 juillet 1823 (le général Bourke donnant ses ordres au général La RocheJaquelein qui s'opposent au général Quiroga), 1828, Palace of Versailles
 Combat de Salo en Italie, 31 juillet 1796. Le général Guyeux assiégé, 1836, Château de Versailles, Palace of Versailles
 Bataille de Hochstaedt sur le Danube remportée par les généraux Moreau et Lecourbe sur l'armée autrichienne, 19 juin 1800, 1838, Palace of Versailles
 Combat de Mautern en Styrie, remporté par l'armée d'Italie commandée par le prince Eugène de Beauharnais, vice-roi d'Italie, sur les troupes autrichiennes du général Jellarich, 25 mai 1809, 1839, Palace of Versailles
 Combat dans les gorges du Tyrol, mars 1797, Palace of Versailles
 La bataille de Raab, 14 juin 1809, Palace of Versailles
 La prise de Stralsund, 20 août 1807, Palace of Versailles
 Le combat de Hollabrunn, 10 juillet 1809, Palace of Versailles

References 

Daumier's Colleagues
Émile Jean Horace Vernet on Art 4 2 Day
Heller-Greenman, Bernadine. "Moreau le Jeune and the Monument du Costume"

1781 births
1857 deaths
18th-century French painters
French male painters
19th-century French painters
19th-century French male artists
18th-century French male artists